Bejkush Birçe (born 13 February 1943) is a former Albanian footballer and coach of Albania.

Managerial career
During a 25-year career, Birçe managed Partizani Tirana, Dinamo Tirana, Flamurtari, Lokomotiva and Naftëtari as well as the Albania national football team. He won two league titles with Partizani and one with Dinamo.

He also was vice-president of the Albanian FA from 1997 to 2001.

References

1943 births
Living people
People from Vlorë County
Footballers from Gjirokastër
Albanian footballers
Association footballers not categorized by position
KF Tirana players
FK Partizani Tirana players
Flamurtari Vlorë players
Albanian football managers
FK Partizani Tirana managers
Flamurtari Vlorë managers
Naftëtari Kuçovë managers
KF Teuta Durrës managers
FK Dinamo Tirana managers
Albania national football team managers
Kategoria Superiore players
Kategoria Superiore managers